Viktor Balikhin may refer to:
 Viktor Balikhin (athlete) (born 1938), Soviet hurdler
 Viktor Balikhin (architect) (1893–1953), Russian avant-garde architect